Deep Powder is a 2013 American thriller drama film starring Shiloh Fernandez and Haley Bennett.

Cast
Shiloh Fernandez as Danny
Haley Bennett as Natasha
John Magaro as Cota
Logan Miller as Crash
Dana Eskelson as Michelle
Crystal Lonneberg as Prison Visitor
Amanda Warren as Officer O'Connor
Josh Salatin as Kaz
Colby Minifie as Snack

References

External links
 
 

American thriller drama films
Killer Films films
Films produced by Christine Vachon
2013 thriller drama films
2013 films
2013 drama films
2010s English-language films
2010s American films